There are a limited number of commercially available diamond mines currently operating in the world, with the 50 largest mines accounting for approximately 90% of global supply. Diamonds are also mined alluvially over disperse areas, where diamonds have been eroded out of the ground, deposited, and concentrated by water or weather action. There is also at least one example of a heritage diamond mine (Crater of Diamonds State Park).

Africa

Angola

Catoca diamond mine
Fucauma diamond mine
Luarica diamond mine

Botswana

Damtshaa diamond mine
Jwaneng diamond mine
Letlhakane diamond mine
Orapa diamond mine
Karowe diamond mine
Lerala diamond mine

South Africa

Baken diamond mine
Cullinan diamond mine (previously "Premier mine")
Finsch diamond mine
Kimberley, Northern Cape
Koffiefontein mine
Venetia diamond mine
Royal Thulare Mine

Others
Baba Diamond Fields, Zimbabwe
Marange diamond fields, Zimbabwe
Murowa diamond mine, Zimbabwe
Williamson diamond mine, Tanzania
Letseng diamond mine, Lesotho
Miba, Democratic Republic of the Congo

Asia

Russia

Mirny GOK

Udachny GOK
Jubilee
Grib
Aykhal
Komsomolskaya
International
Zarnitsa mine

India

Kollur Mine
Panna

Indonesia

Martapura

Australia

Argyle diamond mine
Merlin diamond mine

North America

Canada

Diavik Diamond Mine, Northwest Territories
Ekati Diamond Mine, Northwest Territories
Jericho Diamond Mine, Nunavut
Snap Lake Diamond Mine, Northwest Territories
Victor Diamond Mine, Ontario
Gahcho Kue Diamond Mine Project, Northwest Territories
Renard Diamond Mine, Quebec

United States

Crater of Diamonds State Park, Arkansas (Former mine now a state park)
Kelsey Lake Diamond Mine, Colorado (Former mine no longer in operation)

See also
 Diamond production by country
 Diamonds as an investment
 List of diamonds
List of Goods Produced by Child Labor or Forced Labor
 Golconda Diamonds

References

Diamond mines
mines